Aromanian nationalism is the ideology asserting the Aromanians as a distinct nation. A large number of Aromanians have moved away from nationalist themes such as the creation of a nation state of their own or achieving ethnic autonomy in the countries they live. Despite this, an ethnic-based identity and pride is prevalent in them. In history, Aromanian nationalists often found themselves divided into pro-Greek factions and pro-Romanian ones.

The repeated persecution, attacks and murders against the Aromanians by Greek and Bulgarian gangs in the Ottoman Empire fueled the nationalism of the Aromanians, which was further promoted by the works of some Aromanians in Romania. In 1917, during the presence of Italian troops in Greece in World War I, a group of Aromanian nationalists attempted the creation of an Aromanian state, backed by Romania. However, the Italian troops eventually withdrew, and the Greek authorities sought chasing these figures.

Such a project was revived in World War II after the Axis invasion of Greece, and a Principality of the Pindus was established in 1941, being led by the Aromanian nationalist Alcibiades Diamandi. Despite lacking any real political power, this principality had its own military forces, the Roman Legion, which collaborated with fascist Italian and Nazi German forces. Aromanian was made the official language, the use of Greek was prohibited and the formation of an Aromanian parliament was attempted. However, the Axis forces retreated and the Greek resistance, with several Aromanian members, took over the region in 1944.

See also
 Aromanian question

References

 
Nationalism
Nationalism
Stateless nationalism in Europe